The Strossmayer Gallery of Old Masters is a fine art museum in Zagreb, Croatia exhibiting the collection donated to the city by Bishop Josip Juraj Strossmayer in 1884. Located at 11 Nikola Šubić Zrinski Square, it forms part of the  Croatian Academy of Sciences and Arts (Hrvatska akademija znanosti i umjetnosti).

The Strossmayer Gallery holding includes around 4,000 works, of which some 250 are on display, with the remainder in storage, or on display at other museums or gallery institutions in Croatia.

History

The Strossmayer Gallery of Old Masters opened in November 1884, named after its founder, Josip Juraj Strossmayer, the bishop of Đakovo. The Academy itself, with the bishop as patron, had been founded in 1866 and had moved into its specially built premises in the Zrinevac park in 1880, with a floor reserved to house the bishop's art collection.

Bishop Strossmayer had been buying paintings for 30 years, since his appointment as bishop of Đakovo in 1850. He began with Italian art, mainly Renaissance works from Florence and Venice. In the 1870s, however, he diversified into the schools of northern Europe, and 17th-century art. In 1868, he decided to donate his collection to the Croatian people, entrusting it to the Academy. He oversaw the building of a Viennese style neo-Renaissance palace in Zagreb, designed by the architect Friedrich von Schmidt, so that the works of art could be adequately presented to the public. The gallery was opened to the public on 9 November 1884, displaying 256 works of art.

Over the years, such a prestigious collection attracted further donations, including those of contemporary artists. The expansion led in 1934 to the founding of the Modern Gallery to hold the more recent works. Other additions to the collection included  acquisitions and donations from notable philanthropists such as Ivan Ružić, Marquis Etienne de Piennes, Ante Topić Mimara and Zlatko Baloković.

In 2020, the art gallery building was damaged by a strong earthquake, and is closed as of 2021 due to repairs.

Collections

The Strossmayer Gallery exhibits the works of European painters from 14th-19th century. The holdings have been classified into three major groups: Italian, French and Northern European (German, Flemish and Dutch) works, and also some works by Croatian artists. They were given the collective name of Schiavoni, deriving from the Italian name for Slavs. Although born on the eastern shore of the Adriatic, their lives and work were associated with Italy.

In addition to the paintings in the gallery, the Academy building also houses the Baška Tablet (Bašćanska ploča),  the oldest known example of Glagolitic script, dating from 1102. A large statue of Bishop Strossmayer by Ivan Meštrović is located in the park behind the academy.

See also

 Modern Gallery, Zagreb
 Museum of Contemporary Art, Zagreb
 Croatian Museum of Naïve Art

References

External links

 Strossmayer Gallery of Old Masters on the HAZU website 
 Strossmayer Gallery on the MDC site 
 Old Masters Academy

Art museums and galleries in Zagreb
Donji grad, Zagreb
Art museums established in 1884
1884 establishments in Croatia